Winter Diary is a 1988 Spanish film directed by Francisco Regueiro which stars Fernando Rey and Eusebio Poncela in a father-son relation alongside Francisco Algora, Terele Pávez, Rosario Flores, Lilí Murati, and Victoria Peña.

Plot 
The plot tracks a policy agent seeking evidence for the criminal activities of his father, a former healer who practices euthanasia to people in need of relief.

Cast

Release 
The film was presented in September 1988 at the 36th San Sebastián International Film Festival. It was theatrically released on 29 September 1988.

Reception 
Octavi Martí of El País wrote that Winter Diary is "an extremely ambitious and risky film, which produces a strange sensation of lack of footage".

The review in Fotogramas rated the film 3 out of 5 stars, deeming it to be "an attractive film displaying a hermeticism that ends up becoming excessive", underpinning a game with "puzzling but suggestive results".

Accolades 

|-
| align = "center" | 1988 || 36th San Sebastián International Film Festival || Silver Shell for Best Actor || Best Actor ||  || align = "center" | 
|-
| align = "center" rowspan = "4" | 1989 || rowspan = "4" | 3rd Goya Awards || colspan = "2" | Best Film ||  || rowspan = "4" | 
|-
| Best Director || Francisco Regueiro || 
|-
| Best Actor || Fernando Rey || 
|-
| Best Supporting Actress || Terele Pávez || 
|}

See also 
 List of Spanish films of 1988

References 

Films about euthanasia
1980s Spanish-language films
1998 drama films
Spanish drama films